Dalibor Peršić (born May 28, 1985) is a Bosnian-Croatian professional basketball player who plays for HKK Široki of the Basketball Championship of Bosnia and Herzegovina.

References

1985 births
Living people
ABA League players
Bosnia and Herzegovina men's basketball players
HKK Široki players
OKK Spars players
Shooting guards
Sportspeople from Tuzla
KK Sloboda Tuzla players